Lessandro Façanha Frazão Barreto (born November 5, 1984 in Macapá), widely known as simply Lessandro, is a Brazilian footballer who plays for Santos–AP as midfielder. He already played for national competitions such as Copa do Brasil and Campeonato Brasileiro Série D.

Career statistics

References

External links

1984 births
Living people
Brazilian footballers
Association football midfielders
Campeonato Brasileiro Série D players
People from Macapá
Santos Futebol Clube (AP) players
Sportspeople from Amapá